Davood Parsa-Pajouh  (Persian: داوود  پارساپژوه ) was a prominent scholar at the University of Tehran. He was professor of the Department of Wood Science and Technology at the Faculty of Natural Resources, and the author and translator of several books and articles in this area.

Biography
Parsa-Pajouh was born in Tehran at 1941. After graduation from Hadaf High School, he entered the Faculty of Agriculture at the University of Tehran. He received his bachelor's degree in Forest and Range Engineering at 1965. Thereafter, he was awarded a National Scholarship to continue his post-graduate study at the French National School of Forestry in Nancy, France. He returned to Iran in 1970 after receiving his PhD degree in Wood Technology & Engineering, and started to work as a lecturer in the Faculty of Natural Resources. Parsa-Pajouh participated in several research programs in France and Switzerland during his professional career.

Responsibilities 

Parsa-Pajouh dedicated years of his career to academic executive roles and responsibilities, which are highlighted as follows:
Vice-Chancellor of the University of Tehran
Dean of the Faculty of Natural Resources of the University of Tehran
Head of the Department of Wood Science and Technology
Member of the Academic Promotions Committee of the University of Tehran
Member of the Academic Promotions Committee of the Ministry of Science, Research, and Technology  
Member of the Academy of Sciences and head of the Wood Science Group
Editor of the Iranian Journal of Natural Resources

Honours
Honoured as Distinguished Researcher of the University of Tehran in 1991
Honoured as Distinguished Professor of the University of Tehran in 1992
Honoured as Nationwide Distinguished Professor in 1993
In 2015, his book Wood Technology was honoured as one of the 80 treasures of the University of Tehran

Books and translations
Wood Technology, University of Tehran Press
Industrial Timber Preservation, University of Tehran Press
Atlas of the Woods of the North of Iran, University of Tehran Press
Tree Multi-lingual encyclopedia, University of Tehran Press
Paper and composites from agro-based resources, University of Tehran Press
House Termites, Shahid Rajaee Teacher Training University Press

Death and funeral
Davood Parsa-Pajouh died on 11 August 2015 at the age of 74, at Laleh Hospital in Tehran. He was buried in the Nam-Avaran plot in Behesht-e Zahra, which is reserved for national scholars and scientists.

Davoud Parsa-pajouh Annual Award 
There are prizes totalling 20 million Tomans. Each year PhD students will be selected for creations and innovations in wood and paper science. The prize is currently 20 Million Tomans and will be awarded at the beginning of May (second week of Ordibehesh) of each year within the Teacher Appreciation Week. The board of Wood Science department of Natural Resource Faculty of University of Tehran is in charge of this selection. PhD students should submit their request via submission form to the faculty.

References

University of Tehran alumni
Academic staff of the University of Tehran
1941 births
2015 deaths